Ruslan Radikovich Navlyotov (born 10 December 1993) is a Russian football player.

Club career
He made his debut in the Russian Premier League for FC Mordovia Saransk on 13 March 2016 in a game against FC Krasnodar.

References

External links
 

1993 births
People from Saransk
Sportspeople from Mordovia
Living people
Russian footballers
Association football defenders
FC Mordovia Saransk players
FC Tyumen players
FC Dynamo Saint Petersburg players
Russian Premier League players
Russian First League players
Russian Second League players
FC Volga Ulyanovsk players